Niños Perseverantes Paraguayos Católico (NIPPAC) is a Catholic youth organization in Paraguay. NIPPAC is a member of the Catholic umbrella of youth organizations Fimcap.

History 
In 2012 NIPPAC hosted the Fimcap World Camp. During the camp the participants of the camp were involved in different social projects. The projects were supported by the 0.7% donation of NIPPAC's German partner organization Katholische Junge Gemeinde.

References

Catholic youth organizations
Youth organisations based in Paraguay
Fimcap
Catholicism in Paraguay